Vilho Rättö (10 March 1913 – 21 January 2002) was a Finnish soldier, a Knight of the Mannerheim Cross and, in civilian life, a driver and an industrial worker.

Private Rättö was the fourth Knight of the Mannerheim Cross, and the first private to be awarded the high decoration. Then, he was an anti-tank gun gunner in (infantry regiment) JR 27 (fi). The stated reason for this award was the capture of an enemy anti-tank gun and destroying four enemy tanks with it, as well as his valiant actions and resourcefulness in the battle.

Later, he was promoted to the rank of ylikersantti (staff sergeant) in the reserve.

References

1913 births
2002 deaths
People from Vyborg District
People from Viipuri Province (Grand Duchy of Finland)
Finnish soldiers
Finnish military personnel of World War II
Knights of the Mannerheim Cross